Sotto voce (literally 'under the voice') means intentionally lowering the volume of one's voice for emphasis. The speaker gives the impression of uttering involuntarily a truth which may surprise, shock, or offend. Galileo Galilei's (probably apocryphal) utterance "" ("And yet [the Earth] moves"), spoken after deciding to recant his heliocentric theory, is a legendary example of a sotto voce utterance.

Uses

Law
In law, "sotto voce" on a transcript indicates a conversation heard below the hearing of the court reporter.

Drama, literature, and rhetoric
In drama, literature, and rhetoric, sotto voce is used to denote emphasis attained by lowering one's voice rather than raising it, similar to the effect provided by an aside. Also similar to an aside, sotto voce can be used to express a character's thoughts out loud. For example, in Chapter 4 of Jane Eyre, Charlotte Brontë uses the term sotto voce to describe Mrs. Reed's manner of speaking after arguing with Jane:

In music, sotto voce is a dramatic lowering of the vocal or instrumental volume.

Band
The Chœur d'Enfants Sotto Voce is a children's choir that resides at the Châtelet Theatre in Paris. They're known for their interpretations of all types of songs, ranging from Broadway to French classics to Jazz.

References

Acting techniques
Rhetorical techniques

da:Sotto voce